The World Internet Project (WIP) is a collaborative research program that brings together academic institutions in 46 partner countries to study the social, economic and political impact of digital technology.

Background
The World Internet Project was founded in 1999 by the Center for the Digital Future at the University of Southern California Annenberg School of Communication and Journalism (the Center was formerly the UCLA Center for Communication Policy.) The Project was created to study the impact of the Internet and related digital technology in national and international communities. 

Based at universities and research institutes, the World Internet Project conducts research, generates publications, and holds annual conferences that explore the impact of these technologies. The World Internet Project studies the views and behavior of internet users and non-users.

Each member institution conducts regular sample surveys of internet use and non-use in its country, including a series of core questions used by all of the partner countries.  The critical defining characteristics of this research are that it is longitudinal, enables cross-country comparison, and includes both internet users and non-users.

The World Internet Project creates international and national reports on Internet use and behavior based on its survey results. The Project published its tenth report in November 2019.

World Internet Project: International Partners 
List updated November 14, 2019

Organizer

United States: Center for the Digital Future, USC Annenberg School of Communications and Journalism

Partner countries 

 Africa (Botswana, Cameroon, Ethiopia, Ghana, Kenya, Mozambique, Namibia, Nigeria, Rwanda, South Africa, Tanzania, Uganda)
 Australia - ARC Centre of Excellence for Creative Industries and Innovation (CCI), Institute for Social Research, Swinburne University of Technology
 Austria - Commission for Comparative Media and Communication Studies (CMC)
 Belgium - University of Antwerp
 Canada - Canadian Internet Project (CIP). Recherche Internet Canada (RIC)
 Chile - School of Communications, Pontificia Universidad Catolica de Chile (UC)
 China - China Internet Network Information Center (CNNIC)
 Colombia – CINTEL (Centro de Investigacion de Las Telecommunicaciones
 Cyprus - Cyprus University of Technology, Department of Communication and Internet Studies
 Czech Republic - Department of Sociology, Charles University in Prague
 France - M@rsouin Network
 Greece – EKKE: (National Centre for Social Research)
 Hungary - ITHAKA- Information Society and Network Research Center
 Indonesia – AAPJII (The Indonesia Association of Internet Service Providers
 Israel - The Research Center for Internet Psychology (CIP) Sammy Ofer School of Communications, The Interdisciplinary Center (IDC)
 Italy - SDA Bocconi, Bocconi University
 Japan - Rikkyo University, College of Sociology
 Macao - University of Macao, Macao Internet Project
 Mexico - Tecnológico de Monterrey
 Middle East (Bahrain, Egypt, Jordan, Lebanon, Qatar, Saudi Arabia, Tunisia, United Arab Emirates
 New Zealand - New Zealand Work Research Institute, Auckland University of Technology
 Portugal - Lisbon Internet and Networks International Research Programme (LINI)
 Qatar - Northwestern University in Qatar
 Russia - Sholokhov Moscow State University for Humanities
 South Africa - South African Network Society Survey, Wits Journalism, University of Witwatersrand
 Sweden - The Internet Foundation in Sweden (IIS)
 Switzerland - Division on Media Change & Innovation, IPMZ – Institute of Mass Communication and Media Research, University of Zurich
 Taiwan - Taiwan e-Governance Research Center, Department of Public Administration, National Chengchi University
 Uruguay - Universidad Catolica del Uruguay

References

External links
Center for the Digital Future: Official Website

World Wide Web